Aphilesthes rustica is a species of beetle in the family Cerambycidae, and the only species in the genus Aphilesthes. It was described by Henry Walter Bates in 1881.

References

Aerenicini
Beetles described in 1881
Monotypic Cerambycidae genera